Sarah Turner may refer to:

 Sarah Turner (filmmaker), British filmmaker and academic
 Sarah Lucille Turner (1898–1972), Missouri lawyer and politician
 Sarah E. Turner, American professor of economics and education